A hair stick (also hairstick) is a straight, pointed device, usually between five and nine inches (13 cm to 23 cm) in length, used to hold a person's hair in place in a hair bun or similar hairstyle.

Unlike many hair pins, which are usually small and quite simple, hair sticks are often more elaborate and decorative, and feature jeweled or carved designs that make them stand out as pieces of luxury jewelry. The price of hair sticks varies greatly depending on the style, materials, and craftsmanship – the cheapest pairs of plastic hair sticks can cost less than a dollar, while a single, hand-crafted hair stick by an artist can cost over two hundred dollars.

Historical use
Hair sticks have been in use for thousands of years, and have been found in cultures of the ancient Egyptians, Romans, and Greeks, India and China. Although some of these have been jewelled, luxury items, such as the gold hair sticks of Egypt, more common, wooden hair sticks have also been found in cultures such as Rome, suggesting that they were in wide use amongst people regardless of their financial standing. However, the most influential culture on modern hair sticks has been Japanese, and in particular the use of decorative Japanese kanzashi.

Although many modern hair sticks draw more on the elaborate approach to the design of kanzashi more than on the simpler designs for functional pins, kanzashi are used within a far more rigid and traditional environment. Kanzashi are frequently floral in design, especially those dictated by the changing of the seasons and used by geisha.

Gallery 

Han Chinese: Chinese hairpin, Buyao
Korean: Binyeo
Japanese: Kanzashi

See also
 Comb
 Hairpin

References

External links
 Aokcorral.com, How to make Butterfly Hair sticks

Fashion accessories
Hairdressing
Chinese headgear